is a railway station in the city of Kariya, Aichi Prefecture,  Japan, operated by Meitetsu.

Lines

Station layout
The station has two opposed side platforms connected by a footbridge. The station has automatic turnstiles for the Tranpass system of magnetic fare cards, and is unattended.

Platforms

Adjacent stations

|-
!colspan=5|Nagoya Railroad

Station history
On 1 April 1935, the Aichi Electric Railway merged with the Nagoya Railroad (the forerunner of present-day Meitetsu). The station was renamed to its present name on March 1, 1952, taking the name of the village Fuji Matsumura. To celebrate the 100th anniversary of the founding of Meitetsu, the station dedicated a toilet in 1994.

Passenger statistics
In fiscal 2017, the station was used by an average of 3271 passengers daily.

Surrounding area
Japan National Route 1
 Fujimatsu Junior High School

See also
 List of Railway Stations in Japan

References

External links

 Official web page

Railway stations in Japan opened in 1923
Railway stations in Aichi Prefecture
Stations of Nagoya Railroad
Kariya, Aichi